Seedorf (in some cases, formerly Seidorf) may refer to:

Places

Germany 
Seedorf, Lower Saxony, municipality in the district of Rotenburg, Lower Saxony
Seedorf, Lauenburg, in the district of Lauenburg, Schleswig-Holstein
Seedorf, Segeberg, in the district of Segeberg, Schleswig-Holstein

Switzerland 
Seedorf, Bern, a municipality in the Canton of Bern
Seedorf, Uri, a municipality in the Canton of Uri
Seedorf, Fribourg, a place in the municipality of Noréaz in the canton of Fribourg
Lac de Seedorf, lake at the above

People
Seedorf family, Dutch-Surinamese footballing family